Ignatius Frederick "Ian" Clarke (10 July 1918, Wallasey, Cheshire, U.K. – 5 November 2009, Milton-under-Wychwood, Oxfordshire, U.K.) was a British scholar and professor of English, known for his work on science fiction as a bibliographer, historian and editor, and also, with his wife Margaret, as a translator of early French science fiction.

Clarke served in military intelligence during WWII. He received his B.A. in 1950 and his M.A. in 1953 from Liverpool University. From 1953 to 1956 he was head of the English department of the Northumberland Education Committee. In October 1958 he became Senior Lecture in General Studies in the Department of Industrial Administration at the Royal College of Science and Technology (which became part of the University of Strathclyde). From 1964 to 1981 he was a professor of English Studies at the University of Strathclyde. Clarke specialized in future-war fiction and his 1966 work Voices Prophesying War is recognized as a major contribution. From 1970 to 1973 he was the chief editor for the science fiction reprint program of Cornmarket Press. In 1974 he received the Pilgrim Award from the Science Fiction Research Association. In 1998 he received the SFRA Pioneer Award for his essay Future-War Fiction: The First Main Phase, 1871–1900. Clarke compiled some important science fiction bibliographies and was the editor for the eight-volume British Future Fiction series.

Upon his death, in addition to his wife Margaret, he was survived by two sons and a daughter.

Books
As bibliographer

As editor

edited with John Butt: 

As translator or editor

References

1918 births
2009 deaths
Alumni of the University of Liverpool
Academics of the University of Strathclyde
20th-century British writers
21st-century British writers
British speculative fiction critics
British speculative fiction editors
British speculative fiction translators
Science fiction academics
Science fiction critics
Science fiction editors
Science fiction translators
People from Wallasey
20th-century British translators
20th-century British male writers
Male non-fiction writers